Brunnsparken (Swedish for "well park") refers to multiple places:

 Brunnsparken, Gothenburg is a famous public square in the very centre of Gothenburg, Sweden.
 Brunnsparken is the Swedish name for the Kaivopuisto park in southern Helsinki, Finland.
 Brunnsparken is a public park located in the district of Adolfsberg in Örebro, Sweden.